Randall Reed is a lieutenant general in the United States Air Force. He commanded the Third Air Force at Ramstein Air Base from 2020 to 2022.

Air Force career
Randall Reed graduated from the United States Air Force Academy with a degree in human factors engineering in 1989, and was commissioned into the United States Air Force. He attended pilot training at Laughlin AFB, and became a C-141 Starlifter pilot. In 1998, he transitioned to flying the KC-135 Stratotanker. He commanded the 55th Air Refueling Squadron, the 379th Expeditionary Operations Group, and the 521st Air Mobility Operations Wing. In 2020, he assumed command of the Third Air Force at Ramstein Air Base from Major General John Wood

In April 2022, Reed was nominated for promotion to lieutenant general and appointment as deputy commander of Air Mobility Command.

Dates of promotion

References

Dwight D. Eisenhower School for National Security and Resource Strategy alumni
Embry–Riddle Aeronautical University alumni
Living people
Recipients of the Air Force Distinguished Service Medal
Recipients of the Defense Superior Service Medal
Recipients of the Legion of Merit
United States Air Force Academy alumni
United States Air Force generals
Year of birth missing (living people)